Sign Language System, also known as Signed Language or Signed Polish, is a manually coded form of Polish that uses the signs of Polish Sign Language. It is commonly used for simultaneous "translation" of Polish into sign.

Notes

References 

Polish
Polish language
Languages of Poland